Cold weather may refer to:

Cold wave, a weather phenomenon distinguished by cooling of the air
Cold Weather, a 2010 American mystery film